Jerry Scott is an American curler from Hibbing, Minnesota.

Awards
 United States Curling Association Hall of Fame:
 1994 (with all 1976 world champions team: skip Bruce Roberts, third Joe Roberts and second Gary Kleffman).

Teams

References

External links
 

Living people
American male curlers
World curling champions
American curling champions
Sportspeople from Hibbing, Minnesota
Year of birth missing (living people)